The 1992 Wisconsin–La Crosse Eagles football team represented the University of Wisconsin–La Crosse as a member of the Wisconsin State University Conference (WSUC) during the 1992 NCAA Division III football season. In their 24th season under head coach Roger Harring, the Eagles compiled a 12–0–1 record and won the WSUC championship.

The team played its home games at Veterans Memorial Stadium in La Crosse, Wisconsin.

Schedule

References

Wisconsin-La Crosse
Wisconsin–La Crosse Eagles football seasons
NCAA Division III Football Champions
College football undefeated seasons
Wisconsin–La Crosse Eagles football